John McStay (born 24 December 1965 in Larkhall, South Lanarkshire) is a Scottish former professional footballer who played as a defender. He is a cousin of former Celtic player Paul McStay.

McStay played for nine clubs in a sixteen-year professional career before moving into junior football with Glenafton Athletic in 2000. He went on to become assistant manager to Peter Hetherston at Albion Rovers, one of his former clubs.

He had an on-field altercation with Duncan Ferguson during a Scottish Premier Division encounter between Rangers and Raith Rovers at Ibrox Stadium on 16 April 1994. Ferguson, of Rangers, headbutted McStay, of the visiting Raith, in the south-west corner of the Ibrox pitch. Referee Kenny Clark and his linesmen missed the incident, hence Ferguson avoided a dismissal, but  he was subsequently charged with assault and, as it was his fourth such conviction, he was sentenced to three months in prison.

McStay also worked as a painter and decorator, including during  breaks in his playing career, and was part of the maintenance department at Celtic Park.

Jock McStay's son, Jonny, is also a footballer who played as a forward for various clubs at Junior level in the 2010s. The same-named player, John McStay, who played for Motherwell and Ayr United in the 2000s, is the son of former player Willie McStay, also a cousin of Jock.

References

External links
 

Living people
1965 births
Sportspeople from Larkhall
Scottish footballers
Footballers from South Lanarkshire
Association football defenders
Albion Rovers F.C. players
Ayr United F.C. players
Clyde F.C. players
Clydebank F.C. (1965) players
East Fife F.C. players
Falkirk F.C. players
Hamilton Academical F.C. players
Motherwell F.C. players
Raith Rovers F.C. players
Scottish Football League players
Scottish football managers
Glenafton Athletic F.C. managers
Glenafton Athletic F.C. players
Scottish Junior Football Association players
John